Braigh nan Uamhachan (765 m) is a mountain in the Northwest Highlands of Scotland. It is located north of Glenfinnan in Lochaber.

Taking the form of a long ridge, the climb is steep and pathless, but provides fantastic views of all the neighbouring peaks from its summit.

References

Mountains and hills of the Northwest Highlands
Marilyns of Scotland
Corbetts